Chanchelulla Wilderness is an 8,062-acre (3,263 ha) wilderness area under the jurisdiction of the Shasta-Trinity National Forest in the U.S. state of California.  Established in 1984, the Wilderness is centered around Chanchelulla Peak standing at 6,399 feet (1,950 m). The southern slopes are covered in thickets of chaparral while the northern slopes hold pockets of pine, fir, and cedar.  Wildlife in the area include deer, American black bears, fishers, North American cougars, birds of prey, owls (including northern spotted owls), and numerous songbirds.

See also
List of U.S. Wilderness Areas

References

External links
Chanchelulla Wilderness - Shasta-Trinity National Forest USFS
Chanchelulla Wilderness Fact Sheet - California Wilderness Coalition
Chanchelulla Peak - SummitPost.org

IUCN Category Ib
Wilderness areas of California
Shasta-Trinity National Forest
Protected areas of Trinity County, California
Protected areas established in 1984
1984 establishments in California